The Hatnuța is a left tributary of the river Suceava in Romania. It discharges into the Suceava near Dărmănești.

References

Rivers of Romania
Rivers of Suceava County